The 2009–10 Illinois Fighting Illini men's basketball team represented University of Illinois at Urbana–Champaign in the 2009–10 NCAA Division I men's basketball season. This was head coach Bruce Weber's seventh season at the school. They are members of the Big Ten Conference and played their home games at Assembly Hall. The Illini finished the season 21–15, 10–8 in Big Ten play and lost in the semifinals of the 2010 Big Ten Conference men's basketball tournament. They were invited to the 2010 National Invitation Tournament where they advanced to the quarterfinals before falling to Dayton.

Pre-season

College GameDay
On Tuesday, August 18, ESPN announced that Illinois will serve as one of the host sites for the network’s popular basketball series, College GameDay, during the 2009–10 NCAA Division I men's basketball season. Two one-hour shows (10:00 a.m. and 7:00 p.m. Central) will originate from the Assembly Hall on February 6, 2010 for the Illinois vs. Michigan State game.  This is Illinois’s first appearance on ESPN College GameDay. The series, which is in its sixth season, will make four first-time stops in 2010. Other first-time hosts include Clemson, Kansas State and Washington. The Illinois/Michigan State game will be the only Big Ten game featured this season.

Jeffrey Jordan
On October 6, 2009 it was reported that Jeffrey Jordan was talking to former teammates and coaches about a possible return to the Illinois basketball team.  Jordan had left the team in June, after his second season, to focus on school. October 16, 2009, coach Bruce Weber said that Jordan planned to return to the team.

Pre-season rankings

Various publications and news sources released their preseason rankings prior to the start of the 2009–10 season. Illinois has been ranked by the publications below.  The Fighting Illini were ranked 23rd by the Associated Press in their pre-season poll released.  The Illini received the 27th most votes in the Coaches poll and failed to make their Top 25.

Losses and additions
Illinois lost a good portion of their backcourt with the departure of 2008-09 senior guards Chester Frazier, Trent Meacham, and Calvin Brock.  Freshmen Joseph Bertrand, Brandon Paul and D.J. Richardson help fill the holes in the guard positions, while freshmen Stan Simpson and Tyler Griffey will add depth to the frontcourt.

2009 additions

Roster

Schedule

Source
 All times are Central

|-
!colspan=12 style="background:#DF4E38; color:white;"| Exhibition

|-
!colspan=12 style="background:#DF4E38; color:white;"| Non-Conference regular season

|-
!colspan=9 style="background:#DF4E38; color:#FFFFFF;"|Big Ten regular season

|-
!colspan=9 style="text-align: center; background:#DF4E38"|Big Ten tournament

|-
!colspan=9 style="text-align: center; background:#DF4E38"|National Invitation Tournament

The March 17, 2010 NIT first-round game was hosted by Stony Brook due to a previously-scheduled performance by Cirque du Soleil at Assembly Hall.

Season statistics

Rankings

Honors and awards

See also
 Illinois Fighting Illini men's basketball
 Illinois Fighting Illini
 2009–10 Big Ten Conference men's basketball season

References

Illinois
Illinois Fighting Illini men's basketball seasons
Illinois
Illinois
Illinois